Vayakhel, Wayyaqhel, VaYakhel, Va-Yakhel, Vayak'hel, Vayak'heil, or Vayaqhel ( – Hebrew for "and he assembled," the first word in the parashah) is the 22nd weekly Torah portion (parashah) in the annual Jewish cycle of Torah reading and the 10th in the Book of Exodus. The parashah tells of the making of the Tabernacle and its sacred vessels. It constitutes  The parashah is made up of 6,181 Hebrew letters, 1,558 Hebrew words, 122 verses, and 211 lines in a Torah scroll (Sefer Torah).

Jews read it the 22nd Sabbath after Simchat Torah, generally in March or rarely in late February. The lunisolar Hebrew calendar contains up to 55 weeks, the exact number varying between 50 in common years and 54 or 55 in leap years. In leap years (for example, 2019, 2022, 2024, and 2027), parashah Vayakhel is read separately. In common years (for example, 2018, 2020, 2021, 2023, and 2026), parashah Vayakhel is usually combined with the next parashah, Pekudei, to help achieve the number of weekly readings needed (although in some non-leap years, such as 2025, they are not combined).

Readings

First reading – Exodus 35:1–20
In the first reading (aliyah), Moses convoked the Israelites to build the Tabernacle. Moses started by reminding them of God's commandment to keep the Sabbath of complete rest. Then Moses told them to collect gifts of materials from those whose heart so moved them – gifts of gold, silver, copper, colored yarns, fine linen, goats hair, tanned ram skins, acacia wood, olive oil, spices, lapis lazuli, and other stones. Moses invited all who were skilled to make the Tabernacle, its furnishings, and the priests' vestments.

Second reading – Exodus 35:21–29
In the second reading (aliyah), the Israelites brought the gifts that Moses requested.

Third reading – Exodus 35:30–36:7
In the third reading (aliyah), Moses announced that God had singled out Bezalel and Oholiab to endow them with the skills needed to construct the Tabernacle. And Moses called on them and all skilled persons to undertake the task. The Israelites brought more than was needed, so Moses proclaimed an end to the collection.

Fourth reading – Exodus 36:8–19
In the fourth reading (aliyah), the skilled workers fashioned the Tabernacle's curtains, loop, clasps, and coverings.

Fifth reading – Exodus 36:20–37:16
In the long fifth reading (aliyah), they made the Tabernacle's standing, gold clad, polished boards each with 2 tenons, and their 2 silver sockets, bars of acacia-wood overlaid with gold, rings of gold, veil of the covering, 4 pillars of acacia-wood overlaid with gold, screen for the door held by 5 gold clad pillars, and sockets of brass. Bezalel made the ark, cover, and 7 golden oil lamps pushed over against the golden lampstand which partially covers the table.

Sixth reading – Exodus 37:17–29
In the sixth reading (aliyah), Bezalel made menorah and incense altar.

Seventh reading – Exodus 38:1–20
In the seventh reading (aliyah), Bezalel made the altar for sacrifices, laver, and enclosure for the Tabernacle.

Readings according to the triennial cycle
Jews who read the Torah according to the triennial cycle of Torah reading may read the parashah according to a different schedule.

In ancient parallels
The parashah has parallels in these ancient sources:

Exodus chapter 35
Noting that Sargon of Akkad was the first to use a seven-day week, Professor Gregory S. Aldrete of the University of Wisconsin–Green Bay speculated that the Israelites may have adopted the idea from the Akkadian Empire.

Inner-biblical interpretation
The parashah has parallels or is discussed in these Biblical sources:

Exodus chapters 25–39
This is the pattern of instruction and construction of the Tabernacle and its furnishings:

Exodus chapter 35

The Sabbath
 refers to the Sabbath.  prohibits kindling fire on the Sabbath.  reports that when the Israelites came upon a man gathering wood on the Sabbath (apparently with the intent to fuel a fire), they brought him before Moses, Aaron, and the community and placed him in custody, "because it had not been declared what should be done to him." Clearing up any uncertainty about whether the man had violated the law and what punishment should be given, God told Moses that the whole community was to pelt him with stones outside the camp, which they did.

Commentators note that the Hebrew Bible repeats the commandment to observe the Sabbath 12 times.

 reports that on the seventh day of Creation, God finished God’s work, rested, and blessed and hallowed the seventh day.

Observance of the Sabbath is one of the Ten Commandments.  commands that one remember the Sabbath day, keep it holy, and not do any manner of work or cause anyone under one’s control to work, for in six days God made heaven and earth and rested on the seventh day, blessed the Sabbath, and hallowed it.  commands that one observe the Sabbath day, keep it holy, and not do any manner of work or cause anyone under one’s control to work — so that one’s subordinates might also rest — and remember that the Israelites were servants in the land of Egypt, and God brought them out with a mighty hand and by an outstretched arm.

And God told Moses to let no one go out of one’s place on the seventh day.

In , just before giving Moses the second Tablets of Stone, God commanded that the Israelites keep and observe the Sabbath throughout their generations, as a sign between God and the children of Israel forever, for in six days God made heaven and earth, and on the seventh day God rested.

In , just before issuing the instructions for the Tabernacle, Moses again told the Israelites that no one should work on the Sabbath, specifying that one must not kindle fire on the Sabbath.

In , God told Moses to repeat the Sabbath commandment to the people, calling the Sabbath a holy convocation.

The prophet Isaiah taught in  that iniquity is inconsistent with the Sabbath. In , the prophet taught that if people turn away from pursuing or speaking of business on the Sabbath and call the Sabbath a delight, then God will make them ride upon the high places of the earth and will feed them with the heritage of Jacob.

The prophet Jeremiah taught in  that the fate of Jerusalem depended on whether the people abstained from work on the Sabbath, refraining from carrying burdens outside their houses and through the city gates.

The prophet Ezekiel told in  how God gave the Israelites God’s Sabbaths, to be a sign between God and them, but the Israelites rebelled against God by profaning the Sabbaths, provoking God to pour out God’s fury upon them, but God stayed God’s hand.

In , Nehemiah told how he saw some treading winepresses on the Sabbath, and others bringing all manner of burdens into Jerusalem on the Sabbath day, so when it began to be dark before the Sabbath, he commanded that the city gates be shut and not opened till after the Sabbath and directed the Levites to keep the gates to sanctify the Sabbath.

Exodus chapter 38
2 Chronicles  reports that the bronze altar, which  reports Bezalel made, still stood before the Tabernacle in Solomon's time, and Solomon sacrificed a thousand burnt offerings on it.

 reports that Bezalel made the bronze laver and its base from "the mirrors of the serving women who did service at the door of the tent of meeting." 1 Samuel  reports that Eli's sons "lay with the women who did service at the door of the tent of meeting."

In early nonrabbinic interpretation
The parashah has parallels or is discussed in these early nonrabbinic sources:

Exodus chapter 35
1 Maccabees tells a story related to the Sabbath.  told how in the 2nd century BCE, many followers of the pious Jewish priest Mattathias rebelled against the Seleucid king Antiochus IV Epiphanes. Antiochus’s soldiers attacked a group of them on the Sabbath, and when the Pietists failed to defend themselves so as to honor the Sabbath (commanded in, among other places), a thousand died.  reported that when Mattathias and his friends heard, they reasoned that if they did not fight on the Sabbath, they would soon be destroyed. So they decided that they would fight against anyone who attacked them on the Sabbath.

Josephus taught that when the Israelites brought together the materials with great diligence, Moses set architects over the works by the command of God. And these were the very same people that the people themselves would have chosen, had the election been allowed to them: Bezalel, the son of Uri, of the tribe of Judah, the grandson of Miriam, the sister of Moses, and Oholiab, file son of Ahisamach, of the tribe of Dan.

Classical rabbinic interpretation

The parashah is discussed in these rabbinic sources from the era of the Mishnah and the Talmud:

Exodus chapter 35

The Mekhilta According to Rabbi Ishmael taught that  sets forth laws of Sabbath observance here because in  God directed, "And let them make Me a sanctuary," and one might have understood that they could build the sanctuary both on weekdays and the Sabbath. The Mekhilta posited that one might argue that since the Temple service occurs even on the Sabbath, then perhaps the preparation for the service, without which the priests could not perform the service, could occur even on the Sabbath. One might conclude that if the horn of the altar broke off or a knife became defective, one might repair them on the Sabbath.  teaches, however, that even such work must be done only on weekdays, and not on the Sabbath.

Rabbi Judah haNasi taught that the words "These are the words" in  referred to the 39 labors that God taught Moses at Mount Sinai. Similarly, Rabbi Hanina bar Hama said that the labors forbidden on the Sabbath in  correspond to the 39 labors necessary to construct the Tabernacle.

The Mishnah taught that every act that violates the law of the Sabbath also violates the law of a festival, except that one may prepare food on a festival but not on the Sabbath.

A Midrash asked to which commandment  refers when it says, "For if you shall diligently keep all this commandment that I command you, to do it, to love the Lord your God, to walk in all His ways, and to cleave to Him, then will the Lord drive out all these nations from before you, and you shall dispossess nations greater and mightier than yourselves." Rabbi Levi said that "this commandment" refers to the recitation of the Shema, but the Rabbis said that it refers to the Sabbath, which is equal to all the precepts of the Torah.

The Alphabet of Rabbi Akiva taught that when God was giving Israel the Torah, God told them that if they accepted the Torah and observed God's commandments, then God would give them for eternity a most precious thing that God possessed — the World To Come. When Israel asked to see in this world an example of the World To Come, God replied that the Sabbath is an example of the World To Come.

The Gemara posited that perhaps  refers to willful desecration. The Gemara answered that  is not needed to teach that willful transgression of the Sabbath is a capital crime, for  says, "Whoever does any work therein shall be put to death." The Gemara concluded that  thus must apply to an unwitting offender, and in that context, the words "shall surely be put to death" mean that the inadvertent Sabbath violator will "die" monetarily because of the violator's need to bring costly sacrifices.

The Mishnah taught that the priests could lower the Passover sacrifice into the oven just before nightfall (and leave it to roast on the Sabbath), and the priests could light the fire with chips in the pile in the Temple chamber of the hearth (just before nightfall). Interpreting this Mishnah, Rav Huna cited the prohibition of  "You shall kindle no fire throughout your habitations." Rav Huna argued that since  says only "throughout your habitations," the priests could kindle the pile in the Temple chamber of the hearth (even on the Sabbath). Rav Chisda demurred from Rav Huna's argument, as it would allow kindling even on the Sabbath. Rather, Rav Chisda taught that  permits only the burning of the limbs and the fat (of animals sacrificed on Friday before nightfall). Rav Chisda explained that this burning was allowed because the priests were very particular (in their observance of the Sabbath and would not stoke the fire after nightfall).

The Gemara told that Rav Joseph's wife used to kindle the Sabbath lights late (just before nightfall). Rav Joseph told her that it was taught in a Baraita that the words of  "the pillar of cloud by day, and the pillar of fire by night, departed not," teach that the pillar of cloud overlapped the pillar of fire, and the pillar of fire overlapped the pillar of cloud. So she thought of lighting the Sabbath lights very early. But an elder told her that one may kindle when one chooses, provided that one does not light too early (as it would not evidently honor the Sabbath) or too late (later than just before nightfall).

And thus, since some executions require kindling a fire, the Baraita taught that the law prohibits executions on the Sabbath.

Rabbi Levi read  regarding "the middle bar in the midst of the boards, which shall pass through from end to end," calculated that the beam must have been 32 cubits in length, and asked where the Israelites would find such a beam in the desert. Rabbi Levi deduced that the Israelites had stored up the cedar to construct the Tabernacle since the days of Jacob. Thus  reports, "And every man, with whom was found acacia-wood," not "with whom would be found acacia-wood." Rabbi Levi taught that the Israelites cut the trees down in Magdala of the Dyers near Tiberias and brought them with them to Egypt, and no knot or crack was found in them.

The Rabbis taught in a Baraita that the Tabernacle's lower curtains were made of blue wool, purple wool, crimson wool, and fine linen, while the upper curtains that made the tent spread were made of goats' hair. And they taught that the upper curtains required greater skill than the lower, for  says of the lower ones, "And all the women that were wise-hearted did spin with their hands," while  says of the upper ones, "And all the women whose heart stirred them up in wisdom spun the goats." It was taught in Rabbi Nehemiah's name that the hair was washed on the goats and spun while still on the goats.

Rabbi Isaac deduced from  that we must not appoint a leader over a community without first consulting the community. In  Moses said to the Israelites: "See, the Lord has called by name Bezalel, the son of Uri." Rabbi Isaac read  to indicate that God asked Moses whether Moses considered Bezalel suitable. Moses replied that if God thought Bezalel suitable, then surely Moses would have to, as well. God told Moses nonetheless to go and consult the Israelites. Moses asked the Israelites whether they considered Bezalel suitable. And they replied that if God and Moses considered him suitable, surely they had to, as well. Rabbi Johanan taught that God proclaims three things for God's Self: famine, plenty, and a good leader. 2 Kings  shows that God proclaims famine, when it says: "The Lord has called for a famine."  shows that God proclaims plenty, when it says: "I will call for the corn and will increase it." And  shows that God proclaims a good leader, when it says: "And the Lord spoke to Moses, saying, ‘See I have called by name Bezalel, the son of Uri.'" Rabbi Samuel bar Nahmani said in the name of Rabbi Johanan that Bezalel (whose name can be read , betzel El, "in the shadow of God") was so called because of his wisdom. When God told Moses (in ) to tell Bezalel to make a tabernacle, an ark, and vessels, Moses reversed the order and told Bezalel to make an ark, vessels, and a tabernacle. Bezalel replied to Moses that as a rule, one first builds a house and then brings vessels into it, but Moses directed to make an ark, vessels, and a tabernacle. Bezalel asked where he would put the vessels. And Bezalel asked whether God had told Moses to make a tabernacle, an ark, and vessels. Moses replied that perhaps Bezalel had been in the shadow of God (betzel El) and had thus come to know this.

Rabbi Tanhuma taught in the name of Rav Huna that even the things that Bezalel did not hear from Moses he conceived of on his own exactly as they were told to Moses from Sinai. Rabbi Tanhuma said in the name of Rav Huna that one can deduce this from the words of  "And Bezalel the son of Uri, the son of Hur, of the tribe of Judah, made all that the Lord commanded Moses." For  does not say, "that Moses commanded him," but, "that the Lord commanded Moses."

And the Agadat Shir ha-Shirim taught that Bezalel and Oholiab went up Mount Sinai, where the heavenly Sanctuary was shown to them.

A Midrash interpreted  in light of Ecclesiastes  "A good name is better than precious oil." The Midrash taught that name of Bezalel was better than precious oil, as  proclaims his fame when it says, "See, the Lord has called by name Bezalel." (God proclaimed the name of Bezalel as the Divine architect, while Moses proclaimed the priest as such by anointing with oil.)

Reading the words, "see, the Lord has called by name Bezalel," in  a Midrash explained that Israel sinned with fire in making the Golden Calf, as  says, "And I cast it into the fire, and there came out this calf." And then Bezalel came and healed the wound (and the construction of the Tabernacle made atonement for the sins of the people in making the Golden Calf). The Midrash likened it to the words of  "Behold, I have created the smith who blows the fire of coals." The Midrash taught that Bezalel was the smith whom God had created to address the fire. And the Midrash likened it to the case of a doctor's disciple who applied a plaster to a wound and healed it. When people began to praise him, his teacher, the doctor, said that they should praise the doctor, for he taught the disciple. Similarly, when everybody said that Bezalel had constructed the Tabernacle through his knowledge and understanding, God said that it was God who created him and taught him, as  says, "Behold, I have created the smith." Thus Moses said in  "see, the Lord has called by name Bezalel."

 identifies Bezalel's grandfather as Hur, whom either Rav or Samuel deduced was the son of Miriam and Caleb. A Midrash explained that  mentions Hur because when the Israelites were about to serve the Golden Calf, Hur risked his life on God's behalf to prevent them from doing so, and they killed him. Whereupon God assured Hur that God would repay him for his sacrifice. The Midrash likened it to the case of a king whose legions rebelled against him, and his field marshal fought against the rebels, questioning how they could dare rebel against the king. In the end, the rebels killed the field marshal. The king reasoned that if the field marshal had given the king money, the king would have had to repay him. So even more so the king had an obligation to repay the field marshal when he gave his life on the king's behalf. The king rewarded the field marshal by ordaining that all his male offspring would become generals and officers. Similarly, when Israel made the Golden Calf, Hur gave his life for the glory of God. Thus God assured Hur that God would give all Hur's descendants a great name in the world. And thus  says, "see, the Lord has called by name Bezalel, the son of Uri, the son of Hur."

Rav Judah taught in the name of Rav that  indicated that God endowed Bezalel with the same attribute that God used in creating the universe. Rav Judah said in the name of Rav that Bezalel knew how to combine the letters by which God created the heavens and earth. For  says (about Bezalel), "And He has filled him with the spirit of God, in wisdom and in understanding, and in knowledge," and  says (about creation), "The Lord by wisdom founded the earth; by understanding He established the heavens," and  says, "By His knowledge the depths were broken up."

Exodus chapter 36
And  reports that Caleb fathered the Hur who fathered Uri who fathered Bezalel.  reports that "wise men . . . wrought all the work of the Sanctuary," so Bezalel must have been at least 13 years old to have been a man when he worked on the Tabernacle. A Baraita taught that Moses made the Tabernacle in the first year after the Exodus, and in the second, he erected it and sent out the spies, so the Gemara deduced that Bezalel must have been at least 14 years old when Moses sent out the spies, the year after Bezalel worked on the Tabernacle. And  reports that Caleb said that he was 40 years old when Moses sent him to spy out the land. Thus, the Gemara deduced that Caleb was only 26 years older than his great-grandson Bezalel. Deducting two years for the three pregnancies needed to create the three intervening generations, the Gemara concluded that each of Caleb, Hur, and Uri must have conceived his son at the age of eight.

Exodus chapter 37
A Midrash taught that the righteous learn from God's example in creating the world that in beginning any work they should start with light. Thus when God told Moses to build the Tabernacle, Bezalel pondered with what thing he should begin. He concluded that he had better start with the Ark (in which the Israelites would deposit the Torah, the light of the world). And thus  commences the report of the construction of the Tabernacle's furnishings, "And Bezalel made the Ark."

Similarly, a Midrash taught that when God told Moses to make the Tabernacle, he came to Bezalel and conveyed the command, and Bezalel asked what the purpose of the Tabernacle was. Moses replied that it was so that God might make God's Shechinah to dwell there and teach the Torah to Israel. Bezalel then asked where the Israelites would keep the Torah. Moses replied that when they had made the Tabernacle, they would then make the Ark. Then Bezalel said that since it would not be fitting for the Torah to be without a home, they should first make the Ark and then the Tabernacle. On that account,  associates Bezalel's name with the Ark, saying, "And Bezalel made the Ark."

Reading the words, "Bezalel made the Ark of acacia-wood," in  a Midrash taught that God heals with the very thing with which God wounds. Thus, Israel sinned in Shittim (so called because of its many acacia trees), as  says, "And Israel abode in Shittim, and the people began to commit harlotry with the daughters of Moab" (and also worshipped the Baal of Peor). But it was also through Shittim wood, or acacia-wood, that God healed the Israelites, for as  reports, "Bezalel made the Ark of acacia-wood."

Exodus chapter 38

A Midrash explained the mirrors of the women who "performed tasks" (ha-tzovot) at the entrance of the Tent of Meeting in  The Midrash told that when the Israelites were suffering hard labor in Egypt, Pharaoh decreed that they should not sleep at home or have sexual relations with their wives. Rabbi Shimon ben Halafta told that the Israelite women would go down to draw water from the river, whereupon God caused them to draw up small fish in their pitchers. The Israelite women would sell some of the fish, cook some of them, buy wine with the proceeds, and go out to the work fields to feed their husbands. After they had eaten, the Israelite women took their mirrors and looked into them together with their husbands. The wives would say that they were better looking than the husbands. The husbands would say that they were better looking. And in this way, they aroused their sexual desire and became fruitful and multiplied, as  reports, "And the children of Israel were fruitful and swarmed and multiplied and became exceedingly mighty." It was through the use of these mirrors that the Israelites were able to continue to have children even under the demands of harsh labor. When God told Moses to make the Tabernacle, all of the men came to contribute. Some brought silver, some brought gold or brass, onyx, and other gems to be set. They readily brought everything. The women brought the mirrors and presented them to Moses. When Moses saw the mirrors, he was furious with the women, saying that whoever brought the mirrors should be punished, asking what possible use they could have in the Tabernacle. God told Moses not to look down on them, for it was those mirrors that raised up all of the hosts of children born in Egypt. God thus directed Moses to take them and make from them the washbasin and its base for the priests.

In medieval Jewish interpretation
The parashah is discussed in these medieval Jewish sources:

Exodus chapter 35
In the Zohar, Rabbi Jose expounded on  "And let every wise-hearted man among you come and make all that the Lord has commanded." Rabbi Jose taught that when God told Moses in  "Get you wise men and men of discernment," Moses searched all of Israel but did not find men of discernment, and so in  Moses said, "So I took the heads of your tribes, wise men, and full of knowledge," without mentioning men of discernment. Rabbi Jose deduced that the man of discernment (navan) is of a higher degree than the wise man (hacham), for even a pupil who gives new ideas to a teacher is called "wise." A wise man knows for himself as much as is required, but the man of discernment apprehends the whole, knowing both his own point of view and that of others.  uses the term "wise-hearted" because the heart was seen to be the seat of wisdom. Rabbi Jose taught that the man of discernment apprehends the lower world and the upper world, his own being and the being of others.

In modern interpretation
The parashah is discussed in these modern sources:

Exodus chapters 35–39

Noting that  repeats material from  the 19th century Romanian-Argentine explorer Julius Popper argued that  was a later addition, and the Dutch Protestant theologian Abraham Kuenen and the German biblical scholar Julius Wellhausen agreed. But the mid-20th-century Italian-Israeli scholar Umberto Cassuto, formerly of the Hebrew University of Jerusalem, argued that this conjecture was ignorant of ancient Eastern literary style. Cassuto noted that the theme of the founding and building of a shrine was a set literary type in early Eastern writings, and such passages often first recorded the divine utterance describing the plan for the sanctuary and then gave an account of the construction that repeated the description given in the divine communication. Cassuto cited the Ugaritic epic of King Keret, which tells that in a dream, the king received from the god El instructions for the offering of sacrifices, the mustering of an army, the organizing of a military campaign to the land of King Pabel, and the request that Pabel's daughter or granddaughter be given him as a wife. After the instructions, the epic repeats the instructions, varying only the verb forms to the past tense, adding or deleting a conjunction, substituting a synonym, or varying the sequence of words – exactly as  does. Cassuto concluded that  was thus not a later addition, but required where it is by the literary style. Professor James Kugel of Bar Ilan University wrote that the detailed account must have held a fascination for ancient Israelites who viewed the Tabernacle as highly significant, as the structure that allowed God to reside in the midst of humankind for the first time since the Garden of Eden. And the 20th century Reform Rabbi Gunther Plaut
cautioned not to approach  with modern stylistic prejudices, arguing that a person of the ancient Near East – who was primarily a listener, not a reader – found repetition a welcome way of supporting familiarity with the text, giving assurance that the tradition had been faithfully transmitted.

Exodus chapter 35

Plaut noted that the command to observe the Sabbath in  preceded the account of the Tabernacle's construction just as it had been commanded at the end of the original instructions in  so the Sabbath was the bridge that connected the building of the Tabernacle with its deeper purpose. Professor Nahum Sarna, formerly of Brandeis University, wrote that the injunction to observe the Sabbath in  practically repeats  verbatim, with an addition not to kindle fire on the Sabbath. The wording of this prohibition led the Rabbis of the Talmud to understand that fire may not be kindled on the Sabbath itself but may be lit before the Sabbath if not refueled on the Sabbath. The Karaites rejected this interpretation and spent the day without lights (although some later adherents did accept the Rabbinic practice). Sarna wrote that it was probably to demonstrate opposition to the early Karaite view that the Rabbis mandated lighting candles on Friday nights, and to that end, the Geonim (the post-Talmudic heads of the Babylonian academies) instituted the recital of a blessing over them.

Plaut argued that  includes the words "throughout your settlements" to make clear that the injunction not to kindle fire on the Sabbath applied not only to the primary prohibition during the building of the Tabernacle, but also in general. Thus  reporting a man gathering sticks on the Sabbath, recorded a violation of 

In 1950, the Committee on Jewish Law and Standards of Conservative Judaism ruled: “Refraining from the use of a motor vehicle is an important aid in the maintenance of the Sabbath spirit of repose. Such restraint aids, moreover, in keeping the members of the family together on the Sabbath. However where a family resides beyond reasonable walking distance from the synagogue, the use of a motor vehicle for the purpose of synagogue attendance shall in no wise be construed as a violation of the Sabbath but, on the contrary, such attendance shall be deemed an expression of loyalty to our faith. . . . [I]n the spirit of a living and developing Halachah responsive to the changing needs of our people, we declare it to be permitted to use electric lights on the Sabbath for the purpose of enhancing the enjoyment of the Sabbath, or reducing personal discomfort in the performance of a mitzvah.”

Jeffrey Tigay, Professor Emeritus at the University of Pennsylvania, argued that the word , avodah, in  translated as "service" in the New Jewish Publication Society translation (as well as in     3, 5; and ) is better rendered "labor" (referring to construction), as the materials contributed were for the construction of the Tabernacle, not for the worship that would be conducted there afterwards.

Exodus chapter 37
 speaks of "a talent of pure gold." This table translates units of weight used in the Bible into their modern equivalents:

Commandments
According to Maimonides and Sefer ha-Chinuch, there is one negative commandment in the parashah:
The court must not inflict punishment on the Sabbath.

Liturgy
Following the Kabbalat Shabbat prayer service and prior to the Friday evening (Ma'ariv) service, Jews traditionally read rabbinic sources on the observance of the Sabbath, starting with Mishnah Shabbat 2:5. Mishnah Shabbat 2:5, in turn, interprets the laws of kindling lights in

Haftarah

Parashah Vayakhel
When parashah Vayakhel is read alone, the haftarah is:
for Ashkenazi Jews: 
for Sephardi Jews:

Ashkenazi – 1 Kings 7:40–50
Both the parashah and the haftarah in  report the leader's erection of the holy place, Moses' building of the Tabernacle in the parashah, and Solomon's building of the Temple in Jerusalem in the haftarah. Both the parashah and the haftarah note particular metals for the holy space.

Sephardi – 1 Kings 7:13–26
Both the parashah and the haftarah note the skill (chokhmah), ability (tevunah), and knowledge (da‘at), of the artisan (Bezalel in the parashah, Hiram in the haftarah) in every craft (kol mela'khah).

Shabbat Shekalim
When Parashah Vayakhel coincides with the special Sabbath Shabbat Shekalim, (as it does in 2019), the haftarah is

Parashah Vayakhel–Pekudei
When parashah Vayakhel is combined with parashah Pekudei, the haftarah is:
for Ashkenazi Jews: 
for Sephardi Jews:

Shabbat HaChodesh
When the parashah coincides with Shabbat HaChodesh ("Sabbath [of] the month," the special Sabbath preceding the Hebrew month of Nissan – as it does in 2013 and 2017), the haftarah is:
for Ashkenazi Jews: 
for Sephardi Jews: 
On Shabbat HaChodesh, Jews read  in which God commands that "This month [Nissan] shall be the beginning of months; it shall be the first month of the year," and in which God issued the commandments of Passover. Similarly, the haftarah in  discusses Passover. In both the special reading and the haftarah, God instructs the Israelites to apply blood to doorposts.

Shabbat Parah
When the parashah coincides with Shabbat Parah (one of the special Sabbaths prior to Passover – as it does in 2018), the haftarah is:
for Ashkenazi Jews: 
for Sephardi Jews: 
On Shabbat Parah, the Sabbath of the red heifer, Jews read  which describes the rites of purification using the red heifer (parah adumah). Similarly, the haftarah in Ezekiel 36 also describes purification. In both the special reading and the haftarah in Ezekiel 36, sprinkled water cleansed the Israelites.

Notes

Further reading
The parashah has parallels or is discussed in these sources:

Ancient
The Ba‘lu Myth. Ugarit, 2nd millennium BCE. In The Context of Scripture, Volume I: Canonical Compositions from the Biblical World, pages 260–61. Edited by William W. Hallo. Pilgrim Press, 1997. . (building of a palace for Ba'al).

Biblical
 (keeping the Sabbath);  (universally observed Sabbath).
Psalms  (washing, altar);  (sacrifices);  (cherubim);  11 (Tabernacle, courts);  (courts);  (God's sanctuary);  (court of the Tabernacle);  (God's sanctuary);  (incense);  (God's sanctuary).

Early nonrabbinic
Philo. Allegorical Interpretation 3:33:101; On the Migration of Abraham 17:97–98. Alexandria, Egypt, early 1st century CE. Reprinted in, e.g., The Works of Philo: Complete and Unabridged, New Updated Edition. Translated by Charles Duke Yonge, pages 61, 262. Peabody, Massachusetts: Hendrickson Publishers, 1993. .
Josephus, Antiquities of the Jews 3:6:1–10:1. Circa 93–94. Reprinted in, e.g., The Works of Josephus: Complete and Unabridged, New Updated Edition. Translated by William Whiston, pages 85–95. Peabody, Massachusetts: Hendrickson Publishers, 1987. .

Classical rabbinic
Seder Olam Rabbah, chapter 6. 2nd century CE. Reprinted in, e.g., Seder Olam: The Rabbinic View of Biblical Chronology. Translated and with commentary by Heinrich W. Guggenheimer, pages 73–78. Lanham, Maryland: Jason Aronson, 1998. .
Mishnah: Shabbat 1:1–24:5; Beitzah 5:2; Megillah 1:5. Land of Israel, circa 200 CE. Reprinted in, e.g., The Mishnah: A New Translation. Translated by Jacob Neusner, pages 179–208, 298, 317. New Haven: Yale University Press, 1988. .
Tosefta Shabbat 1:1–17:29. Land of Israel, circa 250 CE. Reprinted in, e.g., The Tosefta: Translated from the Hebrew, with a New Introduction. Translated by Jacob Neusner, volume 1, pages 357–427. Peabody, Massachusetts: Hendrickson Publishers, 2002. .
Mekhilta According to Rabbi Ishmael 82:1. Land of Israel, late 4th century. Reprinted in, e.g., Mekhilta According to Rabbi Ishmael. Translated by Jacob Neusner, volume 2, pages 258–62. Atlanta: Scholars Press, 1988. .
Jerusalem Talmud: Terumot 31b; Shabbat 1a–113b; Shekalim 2a, 48b; Beitzah 47a; Nazir 21a, 25b–26a; Sotah 16b; Sanhedrin 27b; Shevuot 1b. Tiberias, Land of Israel, circa 400 CE. In, e.g., Talmud Yerushalmi. Edited by Chaim Malinowitz, Yisroel Simcha Schorr, and Mordechai Marcus, volumes 7, 13–15, 20, 23, 34–36, 44, 46. Brooklyn: Mesorah Publications, 2010–2020. And in, e.g., The Jerusalem Talmud: A Translation and Commentary. Edited by Jacob Neusner and translated by Jacob Neusner, Tzvee Zahavy, B. Barry Levy, and Edward Goldman. Peabody, Massachusetts: Hendrickson Publishers, 2009.

Genesis Rabbah 94:4. Land of Israel, 5th century. Reprinted in, e.g., Midrash Rabbah: Genesis. Translated by Harry Freedman and Maurice Simon, volume 2, page 871. London: Soncino Press, 1939. .
Midrash Tanhuma Vayakhel. 5th–10th centuries. Reprinted in, e.g., The Metsudah Midrash Tanchuma: Shemos II. Translated and annotated by Avrohom Davis; edited by Yaakov Y.H. Pupko, volume 4 (Shemos volume 2), pages 339–89. Monsey, New York: Eastern Book Press, 2004.
Babylonian Talmud: Shabbat 20a, 49b, 70a, 74b, 96b; Eruvin 2b; Yoma 66b, 72b, 75a; Beitzah 4b, 36b; Rosh Hashanah 34a; Megillah 7b. Chagigah 10a–b; Yevamot 6b–7a, 33b; Sotah 3a; Kiddushin 37a; Bava Kamma 2a, 54a, 71a; Sanhedrin 35b, 69b; Makkot 21b; Shevuot 26b; Avodah Zarah 12b, 24a; Zevachim 59b; Bekhorot 41a. Babylonia, 6th century. Reprinted in, e.g., Talmud Bavli. Edited by Yisroel Simcha Schorr, Chaim Malinowitz, and Mordechai Marcus, 72 volumes. Brooklyn: Mesorah Pubs., 2006.

Medieval
Bede. Of the Tabernacle and Its Vessels, and of the Priestly Vestments. Monkwearmouth, England, 720s. Reprinted in Bede: On the Tabernacle. Translated with notes and introduction by Arthur G. Holder. Liverpool: Liverpool University Press, 1994. .
Exodus Rabbah 48:1–50:5. 10th century. Reprinted in, e.g., Midrash Rabbah: Exodus. Translated by S. M. Lehrman, volume 3, pages 546–61. London: Soncino Press, 1939. .
Solomon ibn Gabirol. A Crown for the King, 9:105–06. Spain, 11th century. Translated by David R. Slavitt, pages 14–15. New York: Oxford University Press, 1998. .

Rashi. Commentary. Exodus 35–38. Troyes, France, late 11th century. Reprinted in, e.g., Rashi. The Torah: With Rashi's Commentary Translated, Annotated, and Elucidated. Translated and annotated by Yisrael Isser Zvi Herczeg, volume 2, pages 487–505. Brooklyn: Mesorah Publications, 1994. .
Rashbam. Commentary on the Torah. Troyes, early 12th century. Reprinted in, e.g., Rashbam's Commentary on Exodus: An Annotated Translation. Edited and translated by Martin I. Lockshin, pages 425–29. Atlanta: Scholars Press, 1997. .

Abraham ibn Ezra. Commentary on the Torah. France, 1153. Reprinted in, e.g., Ibn Ezra's Commentary on the Pentateuch: Exodus (Shemot). Translated and annotated by H. Norman Strickman and Arthur M. Silver, volume 2, pages 730–46. New York: Menorah Publishing Company, 1996. .
Maimonides. The Guide for the Perplexed. Cairo, Egypt, 1190. Reprinted in, e.g., Moses Maimonides. The Guide for the Perplexed. Translated by Michael Friedländer, pages 29–31, 393, 397. New York: Dover Publications, 1956. .

Hezekiah ben Manoah. Hizkuni. France, circa 1240. Reprinted in, e.g., Chizkiyahu ben Manoach. Chizkuni: Torah Commentary. Translated and annotated by Eliyahu Munk, volume 3, pages 645–50. Jerusalem: Ktav Publishers, 2013. .
Nachmanides. Commentary on the Torah. Jerusalem, circa 1270. Reprinted in, e.g., Ramban (Nachmanides): Commentary on the Torah. Translated by Charles B. Chavel, volume 2, pages 595–608. New York: Shilo Publishing House, 1973. .
Zohar 2:194b–220a. Spain, late 13th century.
Bahya ben Asher. Commentary on the Torah. Spain, early 14th century. Reprinted in, e.g., Midrash Rabbeinu Bachya: Torah Commentary by Rabbi Bachya ben Asher. Translated and annotated by Eliyahu Munk, volume 4, pages 1418–38. Jerusalem: Lambda Publishers, 2003. .
Jacob ben Asher (Baal Ha-Turim). Commentary on the Torah. Early 14th century. Reprinted in, e.g., Baal Haturim Chumash: Shemos/Exodus. Translated by Eliyahu Touger; edited and annotated by Avie Gold, volume 2, pages 929–57. Brooklyn: Mesorah Publications, 2000. .
Isaac ben Moses Arama. Akedat Yizhak (The Binding of Isaac). Late 15th century. Reprinted in, e.g., Yitzchak Arama. Akeydat Yitzchak: Commentary of Rabbi Yitzchak Arama on the Torah. Translated and condensed by Eliyahu Munk, volume 1, pages 519–35. New York, Lambda Publishers, 2001. .

Modern
Isaac Abravanel. Commentary on the Torah. Italy, between 1492–1509. Reprinted in, e.g., Abarbanel: Selected Commentaries on the Torah: Volume 2: Shemos/Exodus. Translated and annotated by Israel Lazar, pages 404–20. Brooklyn: CreateSpace, 2015. .
Abraham Saba. Ẓeror ha-Mor (Bundle of Myrrh). Fez, Morocco, circa 1500. Reprinted in, e.g., Tzror Hamor: Torah Commentary by Rabbi Avraham Sabba. Translated and annotated by Eliyahu Munk, volume 3, pages 1221–28. Jerusalem, Lambda Publishers, 2008. .
Obadiah ben Jacob Sforno. Commentary on the Torah. Venice, 1567. Reprinted in, e.g., Sforno: Commentary on the Torah. Translation and explanatory notes by Raphael Pelcovitz, pages 474–85. Brooklyn: Mesorah Publications, 1997. .
Moshe Alshich. Commentary on the Torah. Safed, circa 1593. Reprinted in, e.g., Moshe Alshich. Midrash of Rabbi Moshe Alshich on the Torah. Translated and annotated by Eliyahu Munk, volume 2, pages 607–14. New York, Lambda Publishers, 2000. .
Shlomo Ephraim Luntschitz. Kli Yakar. Lublin, 1602. Reprinted in, e.g., Kli Yakar: Shemos. Translated by Elihu Levine, volume 2, pages 345–71. Southfield, Michigan: Targum Press/Feldheim Publishers, 2007. .
Avraham Yehoshua Heschel. Commentaries on the Torah. Cracow, Poland, mid 17th century. Compiled as Chanukat HaTorah. Edited by Chanoch Henoch Erzohn. Piotrkow, Poland, 1900. Reprinted in Avraham Yehoshua Heschel. Chanukas HaTorah: Mystical Insights of Rav Avraham Yehoshua Heschel on Chumash. Translated by Avraham Peretz Friedman, pages 199–202. Southfield, Michigan: Targum Press/Feldheim Publishers, 2004. .

Thomas Hobbes. Leviathan, 3:34. England, 1651. Reprint edited by C. B. Macpherson, page 431. Harmondsworth, England: Penguin Classics, 1982. .
Edward Taylor. "18. Meditation. Heb. 13.10. Wee Have an Altar." In Preliminary Meditations: First Series. Cambridge, Massachusetts: Early 18th century. In Harold Bloom. American Religious Poems, pages 21–22. New York: Library of America, 2006. .
Chaim ibn Attar. Ohr ha-Chaim. Venice, 1742. Reprinted in Chayim ben Attar. Or Hachayim: Commentary on the Torah. Translated by Eliyahu Munk, volume 2, pages 894–909. Brooklyn: Lambda Publishers, 1999. .
Yitzchak Magriso. Me'am Lo'ez. Constantinople, 1746. Reprinted in Yitzchak Magriso. The Torah Anthology: Me'am Lo'ez. Translated by Aryeh Kaplan, volume 10, pages 175–248. Jerusalem: Moznaim Publishing, 1991. . 

Nachman of Breslov. Teachings. Bratslav, Ukraine, before 1811. Reprinted in Rebbe Nachman's Torah: Breslov Insights into the Weekly Torah Reading: Exodus-Leviticus. Compiled by Chaim Kramer; edited by Y. Hall, pages 282–91. Jerusalem: Breslov Research Institute, 2011. .
George Eliot. Adam Bede, chapter 1. Edinburgh and London: William Blackwood and Sons, 1859. Reprinted, e.g., edited by Carol A. Martin, page 9. Oxford: Oxford University Press, 2008. (Paraphrasing  Adam says “Why, it says as God put his sperrit into the workman as built the tabernacle, to make him do all the carved work and things as wanted a nice hand. And this is my way o’ looking at it: there's the sperrit o’ God in all things and all times — weekday as well as Sunday — and i’ the great works and inventions, and i’ the figuring and the mechanics.”).

Samson Raphael Hirsch. The Pentateuch: Exodus. Translated by Isaac Levy, volume 2, pages 664–94. Gateshead: Judaica Press, 2nd edition 1999. . Originally published as Der Pentateuch uebersetzt und erklaert. Frankfurt, 1867–1878.

Samuel David Luzzatto (Shadal). Commentary on the Torah. Padua, 1871. Reprinted in, e.g., Samuel David Luzzatto. Torah Commentary. Translated and annotated by Eliyahu Munk, volume 3, pages 894–95. New York: Lambda Publishers, 2012. .
Samson Raphael Hirsch. The Jewish Sabbath. Frankfurt, before 1889. Translated by Ben Josephussoro. 1911. Reprinted Lexington, Kentucky: CreateSpace Independent Publishing Platform, 2014. .
Yehudah Aryeh Leib Alter. Sefat Emet. Góra Kalwaria (Ger), Poland, before 1906. Excerpted in The Language of Truth: The Torah Commentary of Sefat Emet. Translated and interpreted by Arthur Green, pages 135–38. Philadelphia: Jewish Publication Society, 1998. . Reprinted 2012. .
Alexander Alan Steinbach. Sabbath Queen: Fifty-four Bible Talks to the Young Based on Each Portion of the Pentateuch, pages 68–70. New York: Behrman's Jewish Book House, 1936.
Benno Jacob. The Second Book of the Bible: Exodus. London, 1940. Translated by Walter Jacob, pages 1007–31. Hoboken, New Jersey: KTAV Publishing House, 1992.
The Sabbath Anthology. Edited by Abraham E. Millgram. Philadelphia: The Jewish Publication Society, 1944; reprinted 2018..
Morris Adler, Jacob B. Agus, and Theodore Friedman. “Responsum on the Sabbath.” Proceedings of the Rabbinical Assembly, volume 14 (1950), pages 112–88. New York: Rabbinical Assembly of America, 1951. Reprinted in Proceedings of the Committee on Jewish Law and Standards of the Conservative Movement 1927–1970, volume 3 (Responsa), pages 1109–34. Jerusalem: The Rabbinical Assembly and The Institute of Applied Hallakhah, 1997.
Umberto Cassuto. A Commentary on the Book of Exodus. Jerusalem, 1951. Translated by Israel Abrahams, pages 452–68. Jerusalem: The Magnes Press, The Hebrew University, 1967.

Abraham Joshua Heschel. The Sabbath. New York: Farrar, Straus and Giroux, 1951. Reprinted 2005. .
Morris Adler. The World of the Talmud, pages 28–29. B'nai B'rith Hillel Foundations, 1958. Reprinted Kessinger Publishing, 2007. .
Gerhard von Rad. "The Tent and the Ark." In The Problem of the Hexateuch and Other Essays, pages 103–24. New York: McGraw-Hill Book Company, 1966. LCCN 66-11432.
Elie Munk. The Call of the Torah: An Anthology of Interpretation and Commentary on the Five Books of Moses. Translated by E.S. Mazer, volume 2, pages 505–29. Brooklyn: Mesorah Publications, 1995. . Originally published as La Voix de la Thora. Paris: Fondation Samuel et Odette Levy, 1981.
Victor (Avigdor) Hurowitz. "The Priestly Account of Building the Tabernacle." Journal of the American Oriental Society, volume 105 (number 1) (January–March 1985): pages 21–30.
Pinchas H. Peli. Torah Today: A Renewed Encounter with Scripture, pages 95–98. Washington, D.C.: B'nai B'rith Books, 1987. .
Craig R. Koester. Dwelling of God: The Tabernacle in the Old Testament, Intertestamental Jewish Literature, and the New Testament. Washington: Catholic Biblical Association of America, 1989. .
Harvey J. Fields. A Torah Commentary for Our Times: Volume II: Exodus and Leviticus, pages 86–94. New York: UAHC Press, 1991. .
Nahum M. Sarna. The JPS Torah Commentary: Exodus: The Traditional Hebrew Text with the New JPS Translation, pages 222–31. Philadelphia: Jewish Publication Society, 1991. .
Nehama Leibowitz. New Studies in Shemot (Exodus), volume 2, pages 644–88. Jerusalem: Haomanim Press, 1993. Reprinted as New Studies in the Weekly Parasha. Lambda Publishers, 2010. .
Walter Brueggemann. "The Book of Exodus." In The New Interpreter's Bible. Edited by Leander E. Keck, volume 1, pages 957–74. Nashville: Abingdon Press, 1994. .
Judith S. Antonelli. "Women's Wisdom." In In the Image of God: A Feminist Commentary on the Torah, pages 221–30. Northvale, New Jersey: Jason Aronson, 1995. .
Ellen Frankel. The Five Books of Miriam: A Woman’s Commentary on the Torah, pages 142–45. New York: G. P. Putnam's Sons, 1996. .
W. Gunther Plaut. The Haftarah Commentary, pages 217–21. New York: UAHC Press, 1996. .
Robert Goodman. "Shabbat." In Teaching Jewish Holidays: History, Values, and Activities, pages 1–19. Denver: A.R.E. Publishing, 1997. .
Sorel Goldberg Loeb and Barbara Binder Kadden. Teaching Torah: A Treasury of Insights and Activities, pages 148–54. Denver: A.R.E. Publishing, 1997.
Exodus to Deuteronomy: A Feminist Companion to the Bible (Second Series). Edited by Athalya Brenner, pages 34, 38–39. Sheffield: Sheffield Academic Press, 2000.
Edward L. Greenstein. “Recovering ‘The Women Who Served at the Entrance.’” In Gershon Galil and Moshe Weinfeld, editors. Studies in Historical Geography and Biblical Historiography: Presented to Zecharia Kallai, pages 165–73. Leiden: Brill, 2000.

Carol Meyers. “Women at the Entrance to the Tent of Meeting.” In Women in Scripture: A Dictionary of Named and Unnamed Women in the Hebrew Bible, the Apocryphal/Deuterocanonical Books and New Testament. Boston: Houghton Mifflin, 2000.
Nancy H. Wiener. "Of Women and Mirrors." In The Women's Torah Commentary: New Insights from Women Rabbis on the 54 Weekly Torah Portions. Edited by Elyse Goldstein, pages 172–78. Woodstock, Vermont: Jewish Lights Publishing, 2000.
Martin R. Hauge. The Descent from the Mountain: Narrative Patterns in Exodus 19–40. Sheffield: Journal for the Study of the Old Testament Press, 2001. 
Avivah Gottlieb Zornberg. The Particulars of Rapture: Reflections on Exodus, pages 461–98. New York: Doubleday, 2001. .
Lainie Blum Cogan and Judy Weiss. Teaching Haftarah: Background, Insights, and Strategies, pages 138–51. Denver: A.R.E. Publishing, 2002. .
Michael Fishbane. The JPS Bible Commentary: Haftarot, pages 135–46. Philadelphia: Jewish Publication Society, 2002. .
Alan Lew. This Is Real and You Are Completely Unprepared: The Days of Awe as a Journey of Transformation, pages 53–55. Boston: Little, Brown and Co., 2003. .
Martha Lynn Wade. Consistency of Translation Techniques in the Tabernacle Accounts of Exodus in the Old Greek. Society of Biblical Literature, 2003. .
Robert Alter. The Five Books of Moses: A Translation with Commentary, pages 514–25. New York: W.W. Norton & Co., 2004. .
Jeffrey H. Tigay. "Exodus." In The Jewish Study Bible. Edited by Adele Berlin and Marc Zvi Brettler, pages 191–97. New York: Oxford University Press, 2004. .
Professors on the Parashah: Studies on the Weekly Torah Reading Edited by Leib Moscovitz, pages 150–54. Jerusalem: Urim Publications, 2005. .
W. Gunther Plaut. The Torah: A Modern Commentary: Revised Edition. Revised edition edited by David E.S. Stern, pages 611–26. New York: Union for Reform Judaism, 2006. .
William H.C. Propp. Exodus 19–40, volume 2A, pages 624–722. New York: Anchor Bible, 2006. .

Suzanne A. Brody. "Successful Campaign." In Dancing in the White Spaces: The Yearly Torah Cycle and More Poems, page 84. Shelbyville, Kentucky: Wasteland Press, 2007.
James L. Kugel. How To Read the Bible: A Guide to Scripture, Then and Now, pages 289, 291, 486. New York: Free Press, 2007.
Kenton L. Sparks. “‘Enūma Elish’ and Priestly Mimesis: Elite Emulation in Nascent Judaism.” Journal of Biblical Literature, volume 126 (2007): 637–42. (“Priestly Mimesis in the Tabernacle Narrative (Exodus 25–40)”).
The Torah: A Women's Commentary. Edited by Tamara Cohn Eskenazi and Andrea L. Weiss, pages 521–44. New York: URJ Press, 2008. .
Thomas B. Dozeman. Commentary on Exodus, pages 756–59. Grand Rapids, Michigan: William B. Eerdmans Publishing Company, 2009. .
Jill Hammer. "Listening to Heart-Wisdom: Parashat Vayakhel (Exodus 35:1–38:20)." In Torah Queeries: Weekly Commentaries on the Hebrew Bible. Edited by Gregg Drinkwater, Joshua Lesser, and David Shneer; foreword by Judith Plaskow, pages 113–16. New York: New York University Press, 2009. .
Reuven Hammer. Entering Torah: Prefaces to the Weekly Torah Portion, pages 131–34. New York: Gefen Publishing House, 2009. .
Rebecca G.S. Idestrom. "Echoes of the Book of Exodus in Ezekiel." Journal for the Study of the Old Testament, volume 33 (number 4) (June 2009): pages 489–510. (Motifs from Exodus found in Ezekiel, including the call narrative, divine encounters, captivity, signs, plagues, judgment, redemption, tabernacle/temple, are considered.).
Bruce Wells. "Exodus." In Zondervan Illustrated Bible Backgrounds Commentary. Edited by John H. Walton, volume 1, pages 264–65. Grand Rapids, Michigan: Zondervan, 2009. .

Jonathan Sacks. Covenant & Conversation: A Weekly Reading of the Jewish Bible: Exodus: The Book of Redemption, pages 277–301. Jerusalem: Maggid Books, 2010. .
Joe Lieberman and David Klinghoffer. The Gift of Rest: Rediscovering the Beauty of the Sabbath. New York: Howard Books, 2011. .
James W. Watts. "Aaron and the Golden Calf in the Rhetoric of the Pentateuch." Journal of Biblical Literature, volume 130 (number 3) (fall 2011): pages 417–30.
William G. Dever. The Lives of Ordinary People in Ancient Israel: When Archaeology and the Bible Intersect, page 245. Grand Rapids, Michigan: William B. Eerdmans Publishing Company, 2012. .

Shmuel Herzfeld. "Inspirational Snapshots from Eretz Yisrael." In Fifty-Four Pick Up: Fifteen-Minute Inspirational Torah Lessons, pages 128–34. Jerusalem: Gefen Publishing House, 2012. .
Daniel S. Nevins. "The Use of Electrical and Electronic Devices on Shabbat." New York: Rabbinical Assembly, 2012.
Torah MiEtzion: New Readings in Tanach: Shemot. Edited by Ezra Bick and Yaakov Beasley, pages 480–530. Jerusalem: Maggid Books, 2012. .
Michael B. Hundley. Gods in Dwellings: Temples and Divine Presence in the Ancient Near East. Atlanta: Society of Biblical Literature, 2013. .
Adam Kirsch. "Ancient Laws for Modern Times: When is a tent just a tent and not like a bed or a hat? To update Jewish laws, the rabbis reasoned by analogy." Tablet Magazine. (February 26, 2013). (Shabbat).
Adam Kirsch. "Leave the Jewish People Alone: Rabbis left enforcement of their Talmudic decrees to communal standards and voluntary commitment." Tablet Magazine. (March 5, 2013). (Shabbat).
Adam Kirsch. "Written in the Stars (Or Not): To overcome fated lives, the Talmud's rabbis argued, perform virtuous acts according to Torah." Tablet Magazine. (March 12, 2013). (Shabbat).
Adam Kirsch. "Navigating the Talmud's Alleys: The range of problems and the variety of answers in the study of Oral Law lead to new pathways of reasoning." Tablet Magazine. (March 18, 2013). (Shabbat).
Amiel Ungar. "Tel Aviv and the Sabbath." The Jerusalem Report, volume 24 (number 8) (July 29, 2013): page 37.
Amanda Terkel. "Glenn Grothman, Wisconsin GOP Senator, Fights for a Seven-Day Workweek." The Huffington Post. (January 3, 2014, updated January 23, 2014). (A Congressional candidate said, "Right now in Wisconsin, you're not supposed to work seven days in a row, which is a little ridiculous because all sorts of people want to work seven days a week.").
Ester Bloom. "The Crazy New App For Using Your iPhone on Shabbos."  Jewniverse. (October 1, 2014).
Jonathan Sacks. Lessons in Leadership: A Weekly Reading of the Jewish Bible, pages 111–14. New Milford, Connecticut: Maggid Books, 2015.
"The Crazy New Invention for Using Electricity on Shabbat."  Jewniverse. (April 21, 2015).
Raanan Eichler. "The Poles of the Ark: On the Ins and Outs of a Textual Contradiction." Journal of Biblical Literature, volume 135, number 4 (Winter 2016): pages 733–4.
Jonathan Sacks. Essays on Ethics: A Weekly Reading of the Jewish Bible, pages 137–43. New Milford, Connecticut: Maggid Books, 2016.
Shai Held. The Heart of Torah, Volume 1: Essays on the Weekly Torah Portion: Genesis and Exodus, pages 213–20. Philadelphia: Jewish Publication Society, 2017.
Steven Levy and Sarah Levy. The JPS Rashi Discussion Torah Commentary, pages 68–70. Philadelphia: Jewish Publication Society, 2017.

External links

Texts
Masoretic text and 1917 JPS translation
Hear the parashah chanted 
Hear the parashah read in Hebrew

Commentaries

Academy for Jewish Religion, California
Academy for Jewish Religion, New York
Aish.com
Akhlah: The Jewish Children's Learning Network 
Aleph Beta Academy
American Jewish University - Ziegler School of Rabbinic Studies
Anshe Emes Synagogue, Los Angeles 
Ari Goldwag
Ascent of Safed
Bar-Ilan University 
Chabad.org
The Desert Tabernacle
eparsha.com
G-dcast
The Israel Koschitzky Virtual Beit Midrash
Jewish Agency for Israel
Jewish Theological Seminary
Kabbala Online
Mechon Hadar
Miriam Aflalo 
MyJewishLearning.com
Ohr Sameach
Orthodox Union
OzTorah, Torah from Australia
Oz Ve Shalom – Netivot Shalom
Pardes from Jerusalem
Professor James L. Kugel
Professor Michael Carasik 
Rabbi Dov Linzer
Rabbi Fabian Werbin
Rabbi Jonathan Sacks
Rabbi Shlomo Riskin
Rabbi Shmuel Herzfeld
Rabbi Stan Levin 
Reconstructionist Judaism 
Sephardic Institute
Shiur.com
613.org Jewish Torah Audio
Talia Davis
Tanach Study Center
TheTorah.com
Teach613.org, Torah Education at Cherry Hill 
Torah from Dixie 
Torah.org
TorahVort.com
Union for Reform Judaism
United Synagogue of Conservative Judaism 
What's Bothering Rashi?
Yeshivat Chovevei Torah
Yeshiva University

Weekly Torah readings in Adar
Weekly Torah readings from Exodus